Westminster is a town in Windham County, Vermont, United States. The population was 3,016 at the 2020 census. It is also the first capital of the Republic of Vermont. It borders the state of New Hampshire.

History
Westminster is Vermont's oldest existing town and was chartered in 1735 by the Province of Massachusetts Bay and was called New Taunton or Township Number One. The town did not have any permanent settlers in the area until 1751. New Hampshire settlers came in and the town was later incorporated in the Province of New Hampshire on November 9, 1752, becoming the third chartered town for New Hampshire west of the Connecticut River. When the British government recognized the Province of New York's claims to what is now Vermont, New York moved its Court of Common Pleas for Cumberland County to Westminster in 1772. It was the site of the Westminster massacre in March 1775, in which two men were killed attempting to prevent New York provincial officials from exerting their authority over the area in the long-running dispute over the New Hampshire Grants. On January 15, 1777, a group of Vermonters met in the Westminster courthouse to declare the independence of the Republic of New Connecticut (later renamed the Republic of Vermont).

Geography
According to the United States Census Bureau, the town has a total area of 46.1 square miles (119.5 km2), of which 46.1 square miles (119.3 km2) is land and 0.04 square mile (0.1 km2) (0.06%) is water.

Transportation
Westminster is crossed by Interstate 91 (Exit 5 serves the town), U.S. Route 5, Vermont Route 121 and Vermont Route 123.

The New England Central Railroad has track rights through the town. Amtrak's Vermonter passenger rail line runs through Westminster but does not stop in town. The closest stations are Bellows Falls to the north and Brattleboro to the south.

Demographics

As of the census of 2000, there were 3,210 people, 1,246 households, and 843 families residing in the town.  The population density was 69.7 people per square mile (26.9/km2).  There were 1,412 housing units at an average density of 30.6 per square mile (11.8/km2).  The racial makeup of the town was 97.73% White, 0.40% Black or African American, 0.28% Native American, 0.22% Asian, 0.34% from other races, and 1.03% from two or more races. Hispanic or Latino of any race were 0.69% of the population.

There were 1,246 households, out of which 34.6% had children under the age of 18 living with them, 55.5% were married couples living together, 8.8% had a female householder with no husband present, and 32.3% were non-families. 24.4% of all households were made up of individuals, and 6.7% had someone living alone who was 65 years of age or older.  The average household size was 2.58 and the average family size was 3.06.

In the town, the population was spread out, with 27.3% under the age of 18, 5.5% from 18 to 24, 29.8% from 25 to 44, 27.1% from 45 to 64, and 10.3% who were 65 years of age or older.  The median age was 38 years. For every 100 females, there were 95.0 males.  For every 100 females age 18 and over, there were 93.1 males.

The median income for a household in the town was $44,263, and the median income for a family was $49,615. Males had a median income of $32,365 versus $26,303 for females. The per capita income for the town was $20,019.  About 7.1% of families and 10.0% of the population were below the poverty line, including 10.8% of those under age 18 and 8.1% of those age 65 or over.

Notable people

 Fanny Allen, daughter Ethan Allen, who converted to Catholicism and became a nun after a religious experience while living in Westminster
 Jerome Allen, educator and author 
 Stephen R. Bradley, US Senator from Vermont
 William Czar Bradley. US Representative from Vermont
 Edmund Burke, US Representative from New Hampshire
 Joseph Dorr Clapp, Wisconsin State Senator, farmer, and businessman, was born in Westminster
 Lot Hall, Justice of the Vermont Supreme Court
 Hiram Pratt, mayor of Buffalo, New York 
 Mark Richards, US Congressman and seventh Lieutenant Governor of Vermont

See also
 Kurn Hattin Homes for Children
 List of capitals in the United States#Vermont Republic

References

External links
 
 Town of Westminster official website
 City-Data.com
 ePodunk

Towns in Vermont
 
Vermont populated places on the Connecticut River
Towns in Windham County, Vermont
Capitals of former nations
1735 establishments in the Thirteen Colonies